The tale of Phyllis and Aristotle is a medieval cautionary tale about the triumph of a seductive woman, Phyllis, over the greatest male intellect, the ancient Greek philosopher Aristotle. It is one of several Power of Women stories from that time. Among early versions is the French Lai d'Aristote from 1220.

The story of the dominatrix and the famous intellectual was taken up by artists from the 12th century onwards, in media from stone sculpture in churches to panels of wood or ivory, textiles such as carpets and tapestries, engravings, oil paintings, brass jugs (aquamanile), and stained glass. Artists attracted to the theme include Hans Baldung, Albrecht Dürer, Lucas Cranach the Elder, and Alessandro Turchi.

Story

The tale varies in the telling, but the core of it is as follows: Aristotle advises his pupil Alexander to avoid Phyllis, the seductive mistress of his father, the king, but is himself captivated by her. She agrees to ride him, on condition that she play the role of dominatrix. Phyllis has secretly told Alexander what to expect, and he witnesses Phyllis proving that a woman's charms can overcome even the greatest philosopher's male intellect. Phyllis is also described as Alexander's mistress or possibly wife, rather than his father's.

Origins

The story is said by the Louvre to derive from the German work by Jacques de Vitry in the 13th century.

In 1386, the English poet John Gower included a summary of the tale in his Confessio Amantis (in English, unlike his other major works), a collection of stories of immoral love told in verse. It appears in the poem on Apollonius of Tyre (Book 8, 271–2018), where Gower quips that the philosopher's logic and syllogisms do not save him:

I syh there Aristotle also,
Whom that the queene of Grece so
Hath bridled, that in thilke time
Sche made him such a Silogime,
That he foryat al his logique;
Ther was non art of his Practique,
Thurgh which it mihte ben excluded
That he ne was fully concluded
To love, and dede his obeissance

Also in the 14th century, the Dominican John Herold wrote a Latin version of the story.

In the 15th century, it was featured in the German comedy Ain Spil van Maister Aristotiles (A play of Master Aristotle).

Analysis

Illustrations

Medieval

The cautionary tale of the dominatrix who made a fool of the famous philosopher became popular across medieval Europe. Medieval sculptors in Maasland created aquamanile, jugs in the forms of scenes with human or other figures, depicting Phyllis and Aristotle. The story was depicted in a variety of media including stone, ivory, brass, carpet, tapestry, and engravings.

Early Modern to Enlightenment
Artists such as Hans Baldung, Albrecht Dürer, Lucas Cranach the Elder, Bartholomeus Spranger and Jan Sadeler continued to exploit the theme, eventually with Phyllis entirely naked. Alessandro Turchi called the woman Campaspe, the mistress of Alexander. The media used include engraving, stained glass, wood, and oil painting.

Nineteenth and twentieth centuries

Artists such as Julio Ruelas continued to adapt the Phyllis and Aristotle theme.
Oscar Kokoschka produced a version in 1913.

See also
Rishyasringa

Notes

References

Aristotle
Folklore
Fictional dominatrices
Iconography
Medieval legends